Barf Anbar (also Romanized as Barf Anbār; also known as Barf Andāz) is a village in Hanza Rural District, Hanza District, Rabor County, Kerman Province, Iran. At the 2006 census, its population was 31, in 9 families.

References 

Populated places in Rabor County